The Fall of the Angels is a Miltonesque epic poem by John William Polidori concerned with the creation of the world.

It was published anonymously in 1821 only months before Polidori's suicide.  The only known contemporary review of the poem was a negative one, published on 5 May 1821.  After Polidori's death, a version of the poem with his name on the title page was published.

References

1821 poems
1821 books
British poems
Works published anonymously
Christian poetry
Epic poems in English
Biblical paraphrases
Biblical poetry
Garden of Eden
Cultural depictions of Adam and Eve
Cosmogony
Fiction about God
Fiction about the Devil
Lucifer
Beelzebub
Parallel literature